Belle Rive is a residential neighbourhood in north Edmonton, Alberta, Canada.

It is bounded on the north by 167 Avenue, on the south by 153 Avenue, and on the east by 82 Street.  The western boundary, which it shares with Eaux Claires runs along a line located between 89 Street and 90 Street.

Housing in the neighbourhood is a mixture of single-family dwellings (93%), duplexes (4%) and row houses (3%).  Substantially all residences in the neighbourhood are owner-occupied.

The neighbourhood was initially intended to be named Belle Riva, to honour the city's large Italian community, however the spelling error was never corrected.

Demographics 

Surrounding neighbourhoods

References

External links 
 Belle Rive Neighbourhood Profile
 Belle Rive Demographic Profile
 Belle Rive NSP Land Use Map

Neighbourhoods in Edmonton